Lower Shoreface refers to the portion of the seafloor, and the sedimentary depositional environment, that lies below the everyday wave base. 

It is also used for the sandstone sedimentary structure rock formations that were produced by this process in an earlier geologic era, such as the Cretaceous Period.

Process
The wave base is the maximum depth at which a water wave's passage causes significant water motion.

In this portion of the coastal marine environment, only the larger waves produced during storms have the power to agitate the seafloor.  

Between storms, finer grained sediments accumulate on the seafloor, but during storms those sediments get suspended and moved around, resulting in a sedimentary structure form described as hummocky cross-stratification.

See also
Upper shoreface
Sedimentary structures

References

Physical oceanography
Sedimentology
Sedimentary structures